Giżyn may refer to the following places:
Giżyn, Greater Poland Voivodeship (west-central Poland)
Giżyn, Masovian Voivodeship (east-central Poland)
Giżyn, Myślibórz County in West Pomeranian Voivodeship (north-west Poland)
Giżyn, Pyrzyce County in West Pomeranian Voivodeship (north-west Poland)